Bill Blackwood (born April 5, 1955) is a Canadian former professional ice hockey defenceman.

During the 1977–78 season, Blackwood played three games in the World Hockey Association with the Indianapolis Racers.

Awards and honors

References

External links

1955 births
Living people
AHCA Division I men's ice hockey All-Americans
Canadian ice hockey defencemen
Clarkson Golden Knights men's ice hockey players
Fort Wayne Komets players
Ice hockey people from Ontario
Indianapolis Racers players
Sportspeople from Greater Sudbury